The 1949 Eastern Illinois Panthers football team represented Eastern Illinois University as a member of the Illinois Intercollegiate Athletic Conference (IIAC) during the 1949 college football season. The team was led by fourth-year head coach Maynard O'Brien and played their home games at Lincoln Field in Charleston, Illinois. The Panthers finished the season with a 3–5 record overall and a 2–2 record in conference play.

Schedule

References

Eastern Illinois
Eastern Illinois Panthers football seasons
Eastern Illinois Panthers football